Nigel Brady (born 9 October 1979) is an Irish former rugby union footballer. He made his debut for Ulster in 2002. As of January 13, 2010, Brady has capped 65 times for Ulster and was re-signed for a two-year contract extension in 2010. Because of a thigh injury to Rory Best, the starter for the Ulster team, in the middle of 2009, Brady, as the second, took the lead as captain for the Ulster finale game. In late 2009, Best was out once again for neck surgery and Brady filled in for the interim, which lasted until April 2010. He last played professionally for Aurillac in the French second division in 2013-14 season.

References

1979 births
Living people
Irish rugby union players
Ulster Rugby players
Ireland Wolfhounds international rugby union players
Rugby union hookers